General Logistics Systems B.V., also known as GLS, is a British-owned logistics company based in Amsterdam, Netherlands. The company was known as German Parcel when it was founded in 1989, by Rico Back. It was subsequently rebranded as GLS and is now a subsidiary of International Distributions Services PLC (formerly Royal Mail until 3 October 2022.

Operations
GLS operates directly and via a partnership network within 41 European countries, eight U.S. states and two Canadian provinces.

In 2016/17, GLS shipped 508 million parcels for more than 270,000 customers, with annual revenue of €2.5 billion. By 2020/21, parcel volume had increased to 870 million parcels, with an annual revenue of €5 billion. The firm has approximately 37,000 delivery vans and 4,500 long-distance trucks servicing about 120 national and regional hubs as well as over 1,600 depots and agencies. Germany, Italy and France accounted for 54.6% of GLS’s total revenue in full-year 2019–2020.

Financial results 
According to Royal Mail's full-year 2019-2020 results, GLS contributed 64% of group adjusted operating profit from 30% of group revenues. GLS revenues increased by 15% in FY17/18. In 2019, GLS was estimated to be worth £2 billion based on an operating profit of £180 million and assuming a price-to-earnings (P/E) multiple of 11x.

History 
German Parcel was founded in 1989 as a national parcel service provider in Germany. A European-wide parcel association, General Parcel, was then established in 1992. In 1999, Back led the sale of the company to Royal Mail.

GLS as part of Royal Mail Group
Between 1999 and 2002, Back developed a cross-European parcel service via acquisitions and startups.  In 2002, these companies were unified into the General Logistics Systems (GLS) brand.

Between 2016 and 2017, GLS acquired the California-based next-day parcel delivery company Golden State Overnight (GSO) Delivery Service, as well as the US overnight parcel delivery company Postal Express. GSO was renamed GLS-US in December, 2019.

In September 2018 GLS acquired the Canadian parcel delivery company Dicom, expanding operations in North America and Europe.  GLS became one of the largest ground-based deferred parcel networks in Europe, growing revenue from £1 billion in 2002 to £3 billion in 2019. In October 2021 GLS acquired the Canadian logistics company Mid-Nite Sun Transportation Ltd, operating under Rosenau Transport, further expanding their reach into the Canadian market.

Criticism
In mid-September 2016, hundreds of parcel delivery workers took strike action in Italian cities of Bergamo, Brescia, Piacenza, Bologna and Parma against GLS and its subcontractors to protest against poor working conditions. On the night of 14–15 September 2016, a van broke through a picket line formed by workers in front of the plant operated by GLS subcontractor SEAM in Piacenza. The van struck and killed Egyptian worker Abd Elsalam Ahmed Eldanf. It was reported that eyewitnesses heard the plant's Chief of Staff ordering the driver to break through the picket line. The Piacenza Prosecutor's office concluded that no strike or protest was taking place at that moment and therefore ruled the death was a car accident. The driver was subsequently released, prompting 7,000 workers to take to the streets in Piacenza and at other GLS offices in Italy, as well as from other firms.

References

External sources

1999 establishments in the Netherlands
Logistics companies of the Netherlands
Royal Mail